Épinal station (French: Gare d'Épinal) is a railway station serving the commune of Épinal, Vosges department, France. The station is owned and operated by SNCF, in the TER Grand Est regional rail network and is served by TGV and TER trains. In 2018 the station saw 1,013,669 passengers.

See also 

 List of SNCF stations in Grand Est

References 

Épinal
Railway stations in Vosges (department)
Railway stations in France opened in 1857
1857 establishments in France